Cajon Pass (Spanish: Puerto del Cajón or Paso del Cajón) is a mountain pass between the San Bernardino Mountains to the east and the San Gabriel Mountains to the west in Southern California. Located in the Mojave Desert, the pass is an important link from the Greater San Bernardino Area to the Victor Valley, and northeast to Las Vegas. The Cajon Pass area is on the Pacific Crest Trail.

Cajon Pass is at the head of Horsethief Canyon, traversed by California State Route 138 (SR 138) and railroad tracks owned by BNSF Railway and Union Pacific Railroad. Improvements in 1972 reduced the railroad's maximum elevation from about  while reducing curvature.
Interstate 15 does not traverse Cajon Pass, but rather the nearby Cajon Summit, elevation . The entire area, Cajon Pass and Cajon Summit, is often referred to as Cajon Pass, but a distinction is made between Cajon Pass and Cajon Summit.

In 1851, a group of Mormon settlers led by Amasa M. Lyman and Charles C. Rich traveled through Cajon Pass in covered wagons on their way from Salt Lake City to southern California.

Name
In Spanish, the word cajón refers to a box or drawer. The name of the pass is derived from the Spanish land grant encompassing the area; it was first referred to in English on an 1852 map. Early Latter-day Saint documents, which often referred to the pass as "Cahoon Pass", suggest an alternate explanation for the name, that it is named in honor of Mormon pioneer Andrew Cahoon (pronounced similarly to Cajon), who was an early settler in nearby San Bernardino and  assisted in surveying and laying out the city of San Bernardino.

Aviation
Cajon Pass is known for high wind, turbulence and fog. 
The weather over the pass can vary from foggy days with poor visibility to clear afternoons where aircraft are bounced by gusting Santa Ana winds that top . The wind is typically out of the west, although in Santa Ana and other weather conditions it may be out of the north or the southeast. Air spilling over the San Gabriels can cause violent up- and downdrafts. On a normal day, with the wind out of the west, turbulence usually starts a few miles west of Rialto and continues a few miles to the east, growing in strength above the altitude of the mountains and especially over the pass near the HITOP intersection. In Santa Ana conditions, up- and downdrafts can become violent northeast of Ontario Airport, and turbulence can be experienced east to the Banning Pass, well known for turbulence. The mass and wing loading of an aircraft determine its sensitivity to turbulence, so what may seem violent in a Cessna 172 may seem only mild to moderate in a Boeing 747. In the 2006 Mercy Air 2 accident, an air ambulance helicopter collided with mountainous terrain near the pass in foggy weather.

Rail transport

Traffic 

The California Southern Railroad, a subsidiary of the Atchison, Topeka and Santa Fe Railway, was the first railroad through Cajon Pass. The line through the pass was built in the early 1880s to connect the present day cities of Barstow and San Diego. Today the Union Pacific Railroad and BNSF Railway (the successor to the Santa Fe) use the pass to reach Los Angeles and San Bernardino as part of the Southern Transcon. Due to the many trains, scenery and easy access, it is a popular location for railfans, and many photographs of trains on Cajon Pass appear in books and magazines.

The Union Pacific Railroad owns one track through the pass, on the previous Southern Pacific Railroad Palmdale cutoff, opened in 1967. The BNSF Railway owns two tracks and began to operate a third main track in the summer of 2008. The railroads share track rights through the pass ever since the Union Pacific gained track rights on the Santa Fe portion negotiated under the original Los Angeles and Salt Lake Railroad. The original BNSF (ATSF) line was built in the 1880s and later roads, U.S. Route 66 and I-15, roughly followed this route. The 3.0% grade for a few miles on the south track is challenging for long trains, making the westbound descent dangerous, as a runaway can occur if the engineer is not careful in handling the brakes. The second track, built in 1913, is  longer to get a lower 2.2% grade. It ran through two short tunnels, but both were removed when the third main track was added next to the 1913 line. With the third track, the BNSF lines have a capacity of 150 trains per day.

Incidents
 The steep downhill grade south of the pass was a contributing factor in the May 12, 1989, San Bernardino train disaster.
 Cajon Pass was the site of a major accident on December 14, 1994, when a westbound Atchison, Topeka & Santa Fe intermodal train lost control and crashed into the rear of a westbound Union Pacific coal train just below California Highway 138, between Alray and Cajon. Thankfully, the Santa Fe crew warned the Union Pacific crew ahead of time, and the UP crew on the helper locomotives at the back of their train bailed out and were uninjured, while the Santa Fe crew received minor injuries after bailing out in turn before impact. All of the Santa Fe and UP helper locomotives involved in the collision suffered irreparable damage and were scrapped, while the lead UP locomotives were undamaged.
 On February 2, 1996, a brakeman and a conductor were killed when a Santa Fe manifest train derailed and caught fire at Cajon Pass.
 The August 16, 2016 Blue Cut Fire destroyed a trestle on the Union Pacific mainline.
 On August 21, 2018, a train carrying hazardous materials derailed, causing a FedEx facility near the tracks to evacuate, along with one school that took shelter.

Passenger service
Amtrak's Desert Wind used the pass until it quit running in 1997. The Southwest Chief runs daily between Chicago and Los Angeles, through Cajon Pass on the BNSF line.

In 2020, Brightline initiated planning for a high-speed route between Victorville and Rancho Cucamonga as an extension of their forthcoming Brightline West service. The route was not initially considered by the project's preceding operators, as it was seen as prohibitively expensive.

Road transport
The Mojave Freeway (I-15) was built in 1969 over Cajon Summit west of Cajon Pass. It is a major route from Los Angeles and the Inland Empire to Las Vegas. The freeway runs above and parallel to an original stretch of historic Route 66 and U.S. Route 395. This stretch, now known as Cajon Boulevard, is a short, well-preserved fragment dating to a rerouting and widening of the highway in the early 1950s. Only the southbound/westbound lanes are in use; the northbound/eastbound lanes and corresponding bridges are closed to through traffic. It is along this stretch of road, accessible via either the Kenwood Avenue or Cleghorn Road exits that some of the best trainspotting areas are found. The Cajon Pass segment of I-15 was named the deadliest road in California.

The historic Summit Inn, off the Oak Hills exit at the summit of the pass, was a historic Route 66 diner and was in the same location from 1952 to 2016, when it was destroyed by the Blue Cut fire.  Some maps may show the Cajon Pass as a feature on SR 138, which crosses I-15 south of the summit between West Cajon Valley and Summit Valley. The highest point on I-15 between Los Angeles and Victorville is thus sometimes identified as Cajon Summit. However, the entire area, including Cajon Summit, is often called Cajon Pass.

Pacific Crest Trail
The Pacific Crest Trail goes through the Cajon Pass area, and during the hiking season up to several thousand transient hikers will pass through this area after walking one of the hottest, driest, and most grueling sections of desert on the trail. A nearby McDonald's restaurant happens to be very close to the trail, and it is famous among hikers. Many hikers also spend the night in the one motel at Cajon Junction.

Utilities infrastructure
Three Southern California Edison 500 kV high voltage power lines cross the summit. These lines head to the Lugo substation northeast of Cajon Pass and connect to Path 26 and Path 46. Both Path 26 and 46 provide the Los Angeles metro area with electricity generated from fossil fuel power plants in the Four Corners region, and hydroelectric dams along the Colorado River.

Natural hazards
During October and November 2003, a number of wildfires devastated the hills and mountainsides near and around the pass, forcing the closure of Interstate 15. The following winter, rains in addition to burnt vegetation caused a number of landslides to further close the freeway pass.

On July 17, 2015, during severe drought conditions plaguing the whole state and creating extreme fire hazards, a fast, wind-whipped wildfire swept over Interstate 15 between California State Route 138 and the Oak Hill Road exits, sending drivers running for safety and setting 20 vehicles ablaze, officials said. The vegetation fire, which closed the I-15 southbound lanes and restricted the northbound side to one lane, overtook stalled cars.

The following year the Blue Cut Fire again forced the closure of the freeway for several days starting on August 16, 2016. The fire closed the I-15 north and southbound lanes due to the intensity of the fire. It destroyed a number of outbuildings and homes, and destroyed the Summit Inn Restaurant in Oak Hills. A McDonald's restaurant was also burned but the damage was minor. The fire threatened homes in Lytle Creek, Phelan, Oak Hills and Wrightwood and burned 

It has been known to cause high-profile vehicles such as semi-trucks to lose control or tip over. During wind advisories, Caltrans will use its Changeable message signs to warn motorists of dangerous weather in the Cajon Pass.

Cajon Pass gets snow occasionally, usually not enough to cause closures. When any closure is total, California Highway Patrols often provide escorts through the pass as the Interstate 15 is a major artery for the High Desert region.

When there is high wind or snow in the Cajon Pass, it is fairly common for weather forecasters or reporters from Los Angeles television stations to do location reports from the Cajon Pass.

The San Andreas Fault passes through the Cajon Pass (crossing I-15 on the south side of the summit) and is responsible for the unique local geography. Instrumentation installed at Cajon Pass allows scientists to track earthquakes in the region.

See also
 Tejon Pass
Henry Wade Exit Route a 49er
Santa Fe And Salt Lake Trail Monument

References

External links

A photographic report of Tehachapi and Cajon Pass (May, 2012)

Mountain passes of California
Interstate 15
San Bernardino, California
Landforms of San Bernardino County, California
Rail mountain passes of the United States
Geology of San Bernardino County, California
Inland Empire
Mojave Desert
San Bernardino Mountains
San Gabriel Mountains
Atchison, Topeka and Santa Fe Railway
Southern Pacific Railroad
U.S. Route 66 in California